A Digest of the Laws of England, also known as Comyns' Digest, is a book by Sir John Comyns. The latest English edition was published in 1822. A 120-page, handwritten tabulation by John Neal in 1826 of all cases in the digest is included with the Jeremy Bentham papers at the University College London.

In 1847, John Gage Marvin said:

References
Comyns, Sir John. A Continuation of Comyns' Digest of the Laws of England, brought down to the present time by a gentleman of the Inner Temple. fol. London. 1776. 2d ed. of Comyns' Digest, with the continuation included under one alphabet. fol. London. 1781. 3d ed. with additions, by Stewart Kyd. 6 vols. 8vo. London. 1792. 4th ed. enlarged and continued down to the present time, by Samuel Rose. 6 vols. 8vo. London. 1800. 5th ed. enlarged and continued to the present time, by Anthony Hammond. 8 vols. 8vo. London. 1822. 1st American from the 5th London ed. with the additions of the principal American decisions, by Thomas Day. 8 vols. 8vo. New York and Philadelphia. 1824 - 26.
"Comyns' Digest" in "A Solicitors Library" (1855) 2 Law Chronicle 23* (1 August 1855)
"Comyns' Digest" (1862) 24 Monthly Law Reporter 729 (October 1862)

External links
Comyns, J and Kyd, S. A Digest of the Laws of England. Fourth Edition. Luke White. Dublin. 1793. Vols 1,  2, 3, 4, 5 and 6.
Comyns, J and Hammond, A. A Digest of the Laws of England. Fifth Edition. London. 1822. Vols 2, 3, 4, 5 6, 7 and 8
Comyns, J and Hammond, A and Day, T. A Digest of the Laws of England. First American Edition. J Laval and Samuel F. Bradford. Philadelphia. Collins & Hannay. New York. 1824. Vols 1 and 2. 1825. Vols 3 4, 5 and 6. 1826. Vols 7 and 8.

Law books